Tomin is an antiquated Spanish unit of weight and currency. It may also refer to:

Qendër Tomin, a former municipality in Albania
Sarv Tomin, a village in Iran
El Tomin Airport in Colombia
Tomin (surname)